Gwangdeoksan may refer to:

 Gwangdeoksan (Gangwon/Gyeonggi), a mountain in South Korea
 Gwangdeoksan (South Chungcheong), a mountain in South Korea